Dibamus tebal is a legless lizard in the family Dibamidae. It is endemic to Pulau Simeuleu in the Mentawai Archipelago, Indonesia.

References

Dibamus
Reptiles of Indonesia
Endemic fauna of Indonesia
Mentawai Islands Regency
Reptiles described in 2009
Taxa named by Indraneil Das
Taxa named by Kelvin Kok Peng Lim